The 1924 United States presidential election in Arizona took place on November 4, 1924, as part of the 1924 United States presidential election. State voters chose three representatives, or electors, to the Electoral College, who voted for president and vice president.

Arizona was won by incumbent Republican President Calvin Coolidge, and his running mate Charles G. Dawes, winning 41.26% of the popular vote. Coolidge's percentage of victory was significantly lower than previous Republican President Warren G. Harding who earned a solid 55.6% of the total vote. Many progressive Republicans who sided with Harding in 1920, split from the party again voting for Progressive Party candidate Robert M. La Follette who received an astounding 23.27% of the popular vote. La Follette was a Progressive Republican Senator from Wisconsin who chose to run for President against conservative Republican President Calvin Coolidge, whom he disagreed with on economic issues. LaFollette's greatest strength was found the Western states, particularly Arizona where many voters disapproved of both conservative nominees for the Republican and Democratic Party.

Former U.S. Ambassador to the United Kingdom John W. Davis was the Democratic nominee who had little support outside the South, including Arizona where he received a mere 35.47% of the popular vote, running with Charles W. Bryan, younger brother of former perennial presidential candidate William Jennings Bryan.

Results

Results by county

Notes

References

Arizona
1924
1924 Arizona elections